Lizza may refer to:

People
Lizza Danila (b. 1982), former Filipino swimmer
Ryan Lizza (b. 1974), American journalist

Other
Lizza di Piastreta, a former industrial monorail used for a marble quarry near Massa, Italy
Santo Stefano alla Lizza, a church in Siena, Italy

See also
Liza (disambiguation)
Lizzano (disambiguation)
Lizzana (Garganega), a variety of white Italian wine grape